Frank Magill (30 March 1896 – 6 November 1969) was an  Australian rules footballer who played with South Melbourne in the Victorian Football League (VFL).

Notes

External links 

1896 births
1969 deaths
Australian rules footballers from Victoria (Australia)
Sydney Swans players